Khoruslu (also Romanized as Khorūslū and Khoroosloo; also known as Sākhtemān-e Khorūslū) is a village in Nasrovan Rural District, in the Central District of Darab County, Fars Province, Iran. At the 2006 census, its population was 734, in 172 families.

References 

Populated places in Darab County